Bhagya Rekha is a 1957 Indian Telugu-language drama film, produced by Ponnaluri Brothers under the Ponnaluri Brothers Pvt. Ltd. banner and directed by B. N. Reddy. It stars N. T. Rama Rao, Jamuna  and music composed by Pendyala Nageswara Rao. The film was dubbed into Tamil as Veettukku Vandha Varalakshmi (1958).

Plot
The film revolves around a wise girl Lakshmi who lost her parents in childhood and grows up at her paternal uncle Narayana Rao's (C.S.R) residence. Here Jagadamba (Suryakantam) her shrew aunt, persecutes her a lot. Narayana Rao couple has two more children Kotaiah a soft-hearted person and Kathyayani a pampered daughter. As an astrologer, Narayana Rao predicts that Lakshmi is going to get a rich alliance at the age of 18. Meanwhile, Kotaiah runs away from the house and joins the army. Years roll by, and Jagadamba arranges a match for Katyayani (Sowcar Janaki), but they like Lakshmi (Jamuna) when a rift arises and Lakshmi is necked out. During that plight, she reaches Tirumala hills where she rescues a misplaced baby of a wealthy couple Nagabhushnam (K.V.S.Sarma) & Seetamma (Hemalatha), she carefully handovers her back when the couple gives shelter to Lakshmi. Thereafter, Lakshmi gains everyone's affection in the house, especially their elder son Ravi (N. T. Rama Rao) falls for her. Even his parents respect his decision, but it begrudges Nagabhushnam's brother-in-law Jaganadham (Dr. Sivaramakishnaiah) as he aspires to perform his daughter Parvathi's espousal with Ravi. So, he ploys by bribing Jagadamba & her brother Sambaiah (Ramana Reddy) and they make a falsity that Lakshmi is already married. Learning it, humiliated Lakshmi leaves the house. On the other side, Kathyayani elopes with her love interest Pullaiah (Relangi) along with the money. At the same time, Kotaiah (Nagabhushnam) returns and brings out the reality of baddies when out of shock Ravi collapses. Parallelly, Pulliah spoils the amount brought by Katyayani when Lakshmi helps them to back up. Knowing the whereabouts of Lakshmi through Katyayani, Kotaiah brings her back. By that time, Ravi is terminally ill and recovers to the prayers of Lakshmi. Finally, the movie ends on a happy note with the marriage of Ravi & Lakshmi.

Cast
N. T. Rama Rao as Ravi
Jamuna as Lakshmi
Relangi as Pullaiah
Ramana Reddy as Sambaiah
C.S.R. as Narayana Rao
Govindarajula Subba Rao as Musalaiah
Nagabhushanam as Kotaiah
Dr. Sivaramakrishnaiah as Jagannatham
K. V. S. Sarma as Nagabhushanam
Allu Ramalingaiah as Rangaiah
Padmanabham as Pullaiah's henchmen
Balakrishna as Pullaiah's henchmen
Peketi Sivaram as Photographer
Sowkar Janaki as Kathyayini
Suryakantham as Jagadamba
Hemalatha as Seetamma
E. V. Saroja as Dancer

Soundtrack

Music composed by Pendyala Nageswara Rao. The devotional song Neevundeda Kondapai is very popular.All the tunes for all the songs for both languages are the same with slight changes in playback singers.

Lyrics by Devulapalli, Kosaraju and Eramaakula Aadisesha Reddy. Playback singers are A. M. Rajah, Madhavapeddi Satyam, Malik, Mohanraj, P. Susheela, Jikki, P. S. Vaidehi & T. Satyavathi.

Veettukku Vandha Varalakshmi (Tamil) Songs
Lyrics by Kuyilan and C. A. Lakshmanadass. Playback singers are A. M. Rajah, Madhavapeddi Satyam, Malik, P. Susheela, Jikki and P. S. Vaidhehi.

Awards
 National Film Awards
 1957 - National Film Award for Best Feature Film in Telugu

References

External links
 
 Listen to Bhagya Rekha songs at Raaga.com

1957 films
1950s Telugu-language films
Indian black-and-white films
Films scored by Pendyala Nageswara Rao
Best Telugu Feature Film National Film Award winners
Films directed by B. N. Reddy